Graeme Miller may refer to:

Graeme Miller (cricketer) (1940–2008), Australian cricketer
Graeme Miller (cyclist) (born 1960), New Zealand Olympic cyclist
Graeme Miller (footballer) (born 1973), Scottish professional footballer
Graeme Miller (Alien vs. Predator), a character in the 2004 film Alien vs. Predator